Wojciech Mikołaj Zabłocki (6 December 1930 – 5 December 2020) was a Polish architect and fencer, specialist in the saber modality.

Sports career
Zabłocki participated in four Olympic Games: 1952 Helsinki, 1956 Melbourne, 1960 Rome, 1964 Tokyo and won two silver (1956, 1960) and one bronze medal (1964) in team sabre fencing.

He participated in the FIE World Championships in Fencing and won four gold (team: 1959, 1961, 1962, 1963), one silver (team: 1954) and four bronze medals (individual: 1961; team: 1953, 1957, 1958).

Zabłocki won the Polish fencing championships five times. He was a member of MKS Katowice, Budowlani Kraków, Krakowski Klub Szermierzy (KKSz) and Marymont Warszawa teams.

Art career
Zablocki was an established professional artist.  He was a founding member of the Art of the Olympians.

Architectural works
Zabłocki was the designer of several sports buildings including The Józef Piłsudski Academy of Physical Education in Warsaw and a sports complex in Konin. He also co-designed the Silesian Insurgents Monument in Katowice in 1967 and the Presidential Palace in Damascus.

Selected bibliography
 Z workiem szermierczym po świecie (1962)
 Podróże z szablą (1965)
 Szablą i piórkiem (1982)
 Architektura dla potrzeb czynnej rekreacji w aglomeracjach miejskich (1968)
 Cięcia prawdziwą szablą (1989)
 " Architektura" (2007)

References

 
 

1930 births
2020 deaths
Fencers at the 1952 Summer Olympics
Fencers at the 1956 Summer Olympics
Fencers at the 1960 Summer Olympics
Fencers at the 1964 Summer Olympics
Olympic fencers of Poland
Olympic silver medalists for Poland
Olympic bronze medalists for Poland
Olympic medalists in fencing
Fencers from Warsaw
Polish male fencers
20th-century Polish non-fiction writers
20th-century Polish male writers
Medalists at the 1956 Summer Olympics
Medalists at the 1960 Summer Olympics
Medalists at the 1964 Summer Olympics
Architects from Warsaw
20th-century Polish architects
Polish male non-fiction writers